Rajalingampet is a village in Jagtial district of the Indian state of Telangana.

Geography 
Rajalingampet is located at 
Villages in Jagtial district